Ghostly Swim is a free digital download album released in 2008 by Adult Swim and Ghostly International (through Williams Street Records). The track listing contains songs arranged and recorded in an unusual avant-garde style of pop, rock and hip hop. A sequel album, Ghostly Swim 2, was released in 2014.

Track listing
Michna – "Triple Chrome Dipped" (3:19)
Dabrye – "Temper" (2:49)
The Chap – "Carlos Walter Wendy Stanley" (2:56)
Dark Party – "Active" (4:20)
Tycho – "Cascade" (Live Version) (3:56)
JDSY –	"All Shapes" (1:56)
Deastro – "Light Powered" (2:26)
Matthew Dear – "R+S" (3:44)
FLYamSAM – "The Offbeat" (2:18)
Cepia – "Ithaca" (3:37)
Aeroc – "Idiom"(3:34)
The Reflecting Skin – "Traffickers" (4:08)
School of Seven Bells – "Chain" (4:23)
Ben Benjamin – "Squirmy Sign Language" (3:13)
Kill Memory Crash – "Hit + Run" (5:08)
Osborne – "Wait A Minute" (4:00)
Milosh – "Then It Happened" (3:59)
10:32 – "Blue Little" (4:31)
Mux Mool – "Night Court" (3:17)
Solvent – "Hung Up" (2009 bonus track)

References

Albums free for download by copyright owner
Adult Swim albums
Williams Street Records compilation albums